KInfoCenter is a utility by KDE that provides information about the user's system.

Before KDE 3.1 it was integrated with the control center. Most of the options were originally designed for Linux, but many have been ported to other operating systems. It also provides useful information about KDE, such as available KIO slaves.

Information provided 
The information provided by KInfoCenter is divided into the following subsections provided by various KCM plugins:

Devices
DMA-Channels
Interrupts
IO-Ports
Memory
Network Interfaces
OpenGL
Partitions
PCI
PCMCIA
Processor
Protocols
Samba Status
SCSI
Storage Devices
USB Devices
X-Server
Wayland

Gallery

References

External links 
KInfoCenter User Manual

KDE Applications